Main Street America's local Main Street programs aim to revitalize downtowns and commercial districts through preservation-based economic development and community revitalization. The "Main Street Project" was begun in 1977 by the National Trust for Historic Preservation with a pilot involving 3 towns: Galesburg, Illinois; Madison, Indiana; and Hot Springs, South Dakota. Based on the success in those three towns, a pilot project followed in six states: Texas, Colorado, Georgia, Massachusetts, North Carolina, and Pennsylvania. 

Since then, Main Street America has expanded the program to many other towns. These may be statewide or regional "coordinating programs" or "local programs." Programs determined to be "Designated" follow best-practices established by the National Main Street Center and/or statewide or regional coordinating programs. One requirement of being a "Designated" program is to appoint a full-time staff member, often called a main street manager. 

In 2020, there were 860 Nationally Accredited Main Street America programs and 44 Coordinating Programs.

Alabama
Alexander City, MainStreet Alexander City
Anniston, Main Street Anniston
Athens, Athens Main Street
Birmingham, REV Birmingham
Columbiana, Columbiana Main Street
Decatur, Decatur Downtown Redevelopment Authority
Dothan, Dothan Downtown Redevelopment Authority
Elba, Main Street Elba
Eufala, Main Street Eufaula
Florence, Florence Main Street
Foley, Visit Foley!
Fort Payne, FPmainstreet
Gadsden, Downtown Gadsden Inc.
Heflin, Heflin Main Street
Jasper, Jasper Main Street
Marion, Main Street Marion
Monroeville, Monroeville Main Street
Montevallo, Montevallo Main Street
Opelika, Opelika Main Street
Oxford, Main Street Oxford
Scottsboro, Main Street Scottsboro
South Huntsville, South Huntsville Business Association
Wetumpka, Main Street Wetumpka

Alaska
While there is no statewide coordinating program, there is at least one local program accredited by Main Street America.

Accredited Programs
Juneau, Juneau Downtown Business Association. Program sought accreditation by the National Main Street Center in 2016.

Arizona
The Arizona Downtown Alliance was started in 1984 to encourage the redevelopment and improvement of downtowns in Arizona. Steven Griffin served as the President in 1984-1985. William E. Mosher, executive director of Tucson's Downtown Development Corporation was elected president in January 1987. The first ever statewide historic preservation conference, "A Sense of Place" was held June 2003 with support from the Arizona Main Street Program. Around 2008 the Main Street Program was housed under the Arizona Department of Commerce. Today Lani Lott is Coordinator of the Arizona Downtown Alliance, a program of the Arizona Preservation Foundation.

Designated programs
Apache Junction, Apache Junction Main Street
Buckeye, Buckeye Main Street Coalition
Casa Grande, Casa Grande Main Street
Florence, Florence Main Street Program
Globe, Globe Downtown Association
Lake Havasu City, Main Street Uptown Association
Nogales, Nogales Community Development Corporation
Payson, Payson Main Street Program
Pinetop-Lakeside, Pinetop-Lakeside Main Street
Prescott, Prescott Main Street
Safford, Safford Downtown Association
Sedona, Sedona Main Street Program
Show Low, Show Low Main Street, Inc.
Williams, Williams Main Street Association, Inc.
Yuma, Yuma Main Street Program

Non-Designated Programs
Douglas
Glendale, Glendale Downtown Development Corp.
Tucson, Tucson Downtown Development Corp.

Arkansas
Batesville, Main Street Batesville
Blytheville, Main Street Blytheville
Dumas, Main Street Dumas
El Dorado, Main Street El Dorado
Eureka Springs, Main Street Eureka Springs
Hardy, Main Street Hardy
Harrison, Main Street Harrison
Helena, Main Street Helena
Little Rock, Southside Main Street Project
North Little Rock, Main Street Argenta
Osceola, Main Street Osceola
Ozark, Main Street Ozark
Paragould, Main Street Paragould
Rogers, Main Street Rogers
Russellville, Main Street Russellville
Searcy, Main Street Searcy
Texarkana, Main Street Texarkana
West Memphis, Main Street West Memphis

California
California established a statewide coordinating program in 1986. From 1986 to 2002, the California Main Street Program was administered by the California Technology, Trade and Commerce Agency and supported by State General Funds. That agency was eliminated in 2002/03 due to a budget crisis. In 2004 the California Main Street Program was re-established within the Office of Historic Preservation.

Designated Programs
Bellflower, City of Bellflower
Benicia, Benicia Main Street
Brentwood, Downtown Brentwood
Cardiff-by-the-Sea, Cardiff 101 Main Street
Carlsbad, Carlsbad Village Association
Chico, Downtown Chico
Coachella, City of Coachella
Coronado, Coronado MainStreet Ltd.
Encinitas, Encinitas 101
Eureka, Eureka Main Street
Fremont, City of Fremont
Gilroy, Downtown Gilroy
Grass Valley, Grass Valley Downtown Association
Hanford, Main Street Hanford
Hollister, Hollister Downtown Association
Leucadia, Leucadia 101 Main Street
Livermore, Livermore Downtown, Inc.
Mariposa, Main Street Mariposa
Martinez, Main Street Martinez, Inc.
Oakland, Black Cultural Zone
Ocean Beach, Ocean Beach MainStreet Association
Oceanside, Main Street Oceanside
Paso Robles, Paso Robles Main Street Association
Pleasanton, Pleasanton Downtown Association
Redding, Viva Downtown Redding
Richmond, Richmond Main Street Initiative, Inc.
San Luis Obispo, San Luis Obispo Downtown Association

Non-Designated Programs - may be active or inactive
Arcata, Arcata Main Street
Fairfield, Fairfield Downtown Association
 Lakeport, Lakeport Main Street
Monterey, Old Monterey Business Association
San Diego - North Park, North Park Main Street
San Diego - Ocean Beach, Ocean Beach Main Street
Ukiah, Ukiah Main Street Program, Inc.
Vallejo, Vallejo Main Street
Vista, Vista Village Business Association

Colorado
After the "Main Street Project" concluded in 1979, Colorado was one of the first six states selected for establishment of a statewide coordinating program. At the time of founding the Gates Foundation gave $100,000 to underwrite free design services in Main Street communities. Today the Colorado Department of Local Affairs serves the statewide coordinating program. In Colorado there are Designated, Candidate, Graduate, and Affiliate communities.

Designated Communities
Elizabeth, Elizabeth
Granby, Granby Area Chamber of Commerce
Meeker, Meeker
Montrose, Montrose
Woodland Park, Woodland Park

Candidate Communities
Central City, Central City
Hugo
La Junta
Leadville, Leadville
Lyons, Lyons
Rangely
Rifle, Rifle
Trinidad, Trinidad

Graduate Communities
Brush, Brush Area Chamber of Commerce
Lake City, Lake City Downtown Improvement & Revitalization Team (DIRT)
Lamar, Lamar
Ridgway, Ridgway
Steamboat Springs, Main Street Steamboat Springs
Victor, Victor D.R.E.A.M
Wellington, Wellington
Windsor, Windsor

Affiliate Communities
Aurora, Aurora Cultural Arts District
Bennett
Berthoud
Buena Vista, Buena Vista
Canon City
Colorado Springs, Old Colorado City
Craig
Creede
Eaton
Florence
Georgetown
Hotchkiss
Idaho Springs
Mead
Naturita
Nederland
Nucla
Georgetown
Larkspur
Monument
Ouray
Sterling
Silverton
Walsenburg
Westcliffe and Silver Cliff, The 'Cliffs (Westcliffe and Silver Cliff)
Wray

Connecticut
Lisa Bumbera was coordinator for the State Program in 1995 when it was established under Connecticut Light and Power Company (CL&P). Connecticut was the first state to have its program sponsored by a private corporation rather than by the state government. The Connecticut Main Street Center was established as an independent non-profit in December 1999. The Connecticut Department of Economic Development became a Founding Partner of the program, along with CL&P. John Simone became the first full-time executive director of Connecticut Main Street in January 2000. When NU merged with Boston-based NStar in April 2012 the future of the program was cast into question. In August 2017, Patrick McMahon became Chief Executive Officer for the Connecticut Main Street Center, Inc.

Darien, Darien Revitalization, Inc.
Hartford - Upper Albany, Upper Albany Main Street
New Haven, Westville Village Renaissance Alliance
New London, New London Main Street Program
Norwich, Rose City Renaissance
Rockville, Rockville Downtown Association
Simsbury, Simsbury Main Street Partnership, Inc., selected to participate in state program in 1995. Anzie O. Glover, a Simsbury resident, was selected to be the director of the Simsbury Main Street Partnership in 1996.
Waterbury, Main Street Waterbury
Winsted, Friends of Main Street,  Common Council authorized application to Connecticut Main Street Program in 1995. The town was accepted into the program in 2001..

Non-participating Communities
East Hartford, Town Council authorized application to Connecticut Main Street Program in 1995. Selected in 1995.
Meriden, Bob Cooper was Meriden's downtown manager in 1996.
New London, Selected in 1995.
Torrington, Torrington Main Street Action Team, Selected in 1995. Shortly after being designated a public forum was held about whether to continue in the program, as they could not secure a full time director as required to participate.
Windsor, John Simone was the first and only executive director of First Town Downtown. After three years he left to become the first full-time executive director of Connecticut Main Street in January 2000.
Vernon, Rockville Downtown Association, Cliff Edwards was hired as manager in 2010.

Delaware
DelBiz on Main is the state Coordinating Program for Delaware, located within the Department of State, Division of Small Business.
 
Accredited Programs
Dover, Downtown Dover Partnership, the Central Dover Business Association looked into the Main Street program in June 1992, at which time the City gave $20,000 towards the program.
Milford, Downtown Milford, Inc.
Rehoboth Beach, Rehoboth Beach Main Street, started in the mid-1990s. Won the Great American Main Street Award in 2009. 
Wilmington, Main Street Wilmington

Other Programs
Delaware City, Main Street Delaware City, Inc.
Middletown, Main Street Middletown
Newark, Downtown Newark Partnership
Wilmington - Brandywine Village, Greater Brandywine Village

District of Columbia
DC Main Streets was established in 2002 and provides services and funding to the 24 Main Street programs in the District of Columbia.

Washington - Barracks Row, Barracks Row Main Street
Washington - Bladensburg Road Main Street
Washington - Chevy Chase Main Street
Washington - Cleveland Park Main Street
Washington - Columbia Heights/Mount Pleasant Main Streets
Washington - Destination Congress Heights
Washington - District Bridges Main Street
Washington - Eastern Market Main Street
Washington - Georgetown Main Street
Washington - Glover Park Main Street
Washington - Dupont Circle, Historic Dupont Circle Main Streets]
Washington - H Street, NE H Street Main Street]
Washington - Logan Circle Main Street
Washington - Lower Georgia Avenue Main Street
Washington - Minnesota Avenue Main Street
Washington - North Capitol Main Street
Washington - Rhode Island Avenue Main Street
Washington - Shaw, Shaw Main Streets
Washington - Tenleytown Main Street
Washington - The Parks Main Street
Washington - Uptown Main Street
Washington - Upper Georgia Avenue Main Street
Washington - U Street Main Street
Washington - Van Ness Main Street
Washington - Ward 7 Business Partnership
Washington - Woodley Park Main Street

Non-Designated Programs
Washington - Deanwood Heights Main Street

Florida
Arcadia, Arcadia Main Street Program
Auburndale, Auburndale Chamber Main Street
Avon Park, Avon Park Main Street
Bartow, Downtown Bartow, Inc.
Brooksville, Florida, Brooksville Main Street
Blountstown, Blountstown Chamber of Comm
Clearwater, Clearwater Main Street
Cocoa, Cocoa Main Street
Crestview, Main Street Crestview Association
Crystal River Main Street
Dade City, Downtown Dade City Main Street, Inc.
Daytona Beach, Daytona Beach Partnership
DeLand, MainStreet DeLand Association
East Stuart, East Stuart Main Street
Eau Gallie Arts District
Eustis, Eustis Main Street, Inc.
Fernandina Beach, Florida Fernandina Beach Main Street
Fort Myers, Downtown Management Corporation
Fort Pierce, Fort Pierce Main Street, Inc.
Fort Pierce - Lincoln Park, Lincoln Park Main Street
Haines City, Haines City Main Street
High Springs, High Springs Community Development Corporation
Homestead, Homestead Main Street
Jasper, Main Street Hamilton County
Kissimmee, Kissimmee Main Street Program
Lake Wales, Lake Wales Main Street
Leesburg, Leesburg Partnership, Inc.
Marianna, Marianna Main Street
Melbourne, Downtown Melbourne Association
Milton, Main Street Milton
Monticello, Jefferson County Main Street
Moore Haven, Glades County Economic
Naples, Fifth Avenue South
New Port Richey, Greater New Port Richey Main Street, Inc.
Newberry, Newberry Main Street
Okeechobee, Okeechobee Main Street, Inc.
Orlando - Audubon Park, Audubon Park Garden District
Orlando - College Park, Downtown College Park Partnership
Orlando - Downtown South, Downtown South Main Street
Orlando - Ivanhoe Village, Ivanhoe Village Main Street
Orlando - Mills 50, Mills 50 Main Street
Orlando - Milk District
Ocala - Ocala Main Street
Ormond Beach, Ormond Beach Main Street, Inc.
Palatka, Palatka Main Street
Palm Harbor, Old Palm Harbor Main Street
Panama City, Panama City Main Street
Perry, MainStreet Perry, Inc.
Punta Gorda, Main Street Punta Gorda
Quincy, Historic Quincy Main Street
St. Augustine, Vilano Beach Main Street
St. Cloud, St. Cloud Main Street Program
St. Petersburg - 22nd Street, 22nd Street South
St. Petersburg - Grand Central District, Grand Central District Association, Inc.
Starke, Main Street Starke, Inc.
Stuart, Stuart Main Street, Inc.
Venice, Venice Main Street, Inc.
Vero Beach, Main Street Vero Beach
Wauchula, Main Street Wauchula, Inc.
Winter Haven, Main Street Winter Haven, Inc.
Zephyrhills, Main Street Zephyrhills

Georgia
After the "Main Street Project" concluded in 1979, Georgia was one of the first six states selected for establishment of a statewide coordinating program. At the time of founding the Georgia Trust for Historic Preservation raised $100,000 to provide design assistance to Main Street Communities. Today the Georgia Main Street program serves over 100 communities. 

Acworth, City of Acworth - Main Street
Americus, Americus Downtown Development Authority - Main Street
Athens, Athens Downtown Development Authority
Bainbridge, City of Bainbridge Main Street
Baxley, City of Baxley Better Hometown
Blackshear, Blackshear BHT
Blairsville, Blairsville Better Hometown
Bremen, City of Bremen - Better Hometown
Brunswick, Brunswick Main Street
Buchanan, City of Buchanan - Better Hometown
Byron, Byron Better Hometown
Calhoun, Calhoun Main Street
Carrollton, Carrollton Main Street
Cartersville, Cartersville Main Street
Cedartown, Downtown Cedartown Association
Cleveland, Cleveland Better Hometown
Cochran, Cochran Better Hometown
College Park, City of College Park - Main Street
Columbus, Uptown Columbus, Inc.
Commerce, Commerce Main Street
Conyers, Conyers Main Street Foundation
Cordele, Cordele Main Street
Cornelia, City of Cornelia Better Hometown
Covington, Main Street Covington
Dahlonega, Dahlonega Better Hometown
Dalton, Dalton Downtown Development Authority - Main Street
Darien, City of Darien Better Hometown
Donalsonville, Donalsonville Better Hometown
Douglas, Douglas Main Street Program
Douglasville, The City of Douglasville - Main Street
Dublin, Main Street Dublin
Duluth, City of Duluth Main Street
East Point, City of East Point
Eatonton, Better Hometown - Eatonton
Elberton, Main Street Elberton
Ellijay, Better Hometown of Ellijay
Fayetteville, City of Fayetteville - Main Street
Flowery Branch, Flowery Branch Better Hometown
Forsyth, City of Forsyth Better Hometown
Fort Valley, Fort Valley Main Street/DDA
Gainesville, Main Street Gainesville
Gordon, Gordon Better Hometown
Gray - Gray Station, Gray Station Better Hometown
Greensboro, Greensboro Better Hometown
Greenville, Greenville Better Hometown
Griffin, Main Street Griffin
Hampton, Hampton Main Street
Hapeville, Hapeville Main Street
Hartwell, Hartwell Downtown Development Authority - Main Street
Hawkinsville, Hawkinsville Better Hometown
Hazlehurst, Hazlehurst Better Hometown
Hogansville, Hogansville Downtown Development Authority - Better Hometown
Homerville, Homerville Better Hometown
Jefferson, Jefferson Main Street
LaFayette, LaFayette Main Street
LaGrange, LaGrange Downtown Development Authority
Lavonia, Lavonia Better Hometown
Locust Grove, City of Locust Grove Better Hometown
Lyons, Lyons Main Street
Madison, Main Street - City of Madison
Manchester, Manchester Better Hometown
McDonough, Main Street McDonough
Metter, Metter Better Hometown
Milledgeville, Milledgeville Main Street
Millen, Millen Better Hometown
Monroe, Downtown Monroe Main Street
Monticello, City of Monticello - Better Hometown
Moultrie, Moultrie Main Street
Nashville, Nashville Better Hometown, Inc.
Newnan, Main Street Newnan
Oglethorpe, Oglethorpe Better Hometown
Pelham, Pelham Better Hometown
Pembroke, City of Pembroke - Better Hometown
Plains, Plains Better Hometown Program
Richland, Richland Better Hometown, Inc.
Rome, Main Street Rome
Royston, Royston Better Hometown
Sandersville, Main Street Sandersville
Social Circle, Social Circle Better Hometown
St. Marys, City of St. Marys Main Street - Downtown Development Authority
Statesboro, Statesboro Main Street
Stone Mountain, Main Street Stone Mountain
Summerville, Summerville Better Hometown
Suwanee, City of Suwanee
Sylvania, Sylvania Better Hometown - DDA
Tallapoosa, Tallapoosa Better Hometown
Thomaston, Thomaston Main Street
Thomasville, Downtown Thomasville - Main Street
Tifton, Tifton-Tift County Main Street
Toccoa, Main Street Toccoa
Trenton, Trenton Better Hometown
Union Point, Union Point Better Hometown
Valdosta, Valdosta Main Street Program
Vidalia, Downtown Vidalia Association - Main Street
Vienna, Vienna Better Hometown
Villa Rica, Villa Rica Main Street
Warrenton, Better Hometown Warrenton, Inc.
Washington, Washington Main Street
Waycross, Waycross Downtown Development Authority
Waynesboro, City of Waynesboro
West Point, West Point Better Hometown
Winder, Main Street Winder
Woodbine, Woodbine Better Hometown
Woodstock, Main Street Woodstock 
Wrens, Wrens Better Hometown
Wrightsville, Wrightsville Better Hometown

Hawaii
No designated programs

Idaho
The statewide Main Street coordinating program was launched in June 2012 under the Idaho Department of Commerce. Jerry Miller is the state coordinator for Idaho.
 
Designated Programs
Nampa, Downtown Nampa

Affiliate Programs
Coeur d Alene, Coeur d' Alene Downtown Association
Driggs, City of Driggs
Lewiston, Beautiful Downtown Lewiston
Mountain Home, City of Mountain Home

Illinois
Originally field staff with the National Trust for Historic Preservation in Chicago were instrumental in starting the "Main Street Project." One of the three original "Main Street Project" communities was in Galesburg, Illinois, from 1977-1979. Donna Ann Harris was the State Coordinator of the Illinois Main Street Program between 2000 and 2002. Presently Kelly Humrichouser is state coordinator for the Illinois Main Street program that has 19 active programs across the state.

Designated Programs
Alton, Alton Main Street, Inc.
Batavia, Batavia MainStreet
Bloomington, Downtown Bloomington Association
Carbondale, Carbondale Main Street
Chicago - Endeleo Institute (Chicago)
Chicago - Portage Park, Six Corners Main Street
Columbia, Historic Main Street Columbia Association
Crystal Lake, MainStreet Crystal Lake
Dixon, Dixon Main Street
Jacksonville, Jacksonville Main Street
Libertyville, Main Street Libertyville, Inc.
Momence, Main Street Momence
Monticello, Monticello Main Street
Pontiac, Pontiac PROUD
Quincy, Historic Quincy Business District
Silvis, Silvis Main Street
Springfield, Downtown Springfield, Inc.
Sterling, Sterling Main Street
Waukegan, Waukegan Main Street

Non-designated Programs - Some may be active, others not
Aledo, Aledo Main Street, Inc.
Beardstown, Beardstown
Belleville, Main Street Belleville, Inc.
Benton, Downtown Benton, Inc.
Berwyn, Cermak Road Revitalization Board
Blue Island, Main Street Blue Island
Cambridge, Cambridge Main Street
Canton, Spoon River Partnership for Economic Development
Champaign, Champaign Downtown Association
Chicago - Clearing, United Business Association of Midway
Collinsville, Downtown Collinsville
Danville, Downtown Danville, Inc.
Decatur, City Centre Decatur
Du Quoin, DuQuoin Main Street
Swight, Dwight Main Street
Eldorado, Main Street Eldorado, Inc.
Elgin, Downtown Neighborhood
Galesburg, Galesburg Downtown Council. The Galesburg Downtown Council was formed in the fall of 1972 after plans were announced for a new shopping center, the Sandburg Mall. A few years later when Galesburg was selected for the "Main Street Project" in 1977 it made front page news just below the Galesburg Register-Mail masthead. In the article, Robert Carter with the National Trust for Historic Preservation commented "One of the problems we face in this type of work has never been done before."
Genoa, Genoa Main Street, Inc.
Golconda, Main Street Golconda
Hardin County, Hardin County Main Street
Harvard, Harvard Main Street
Hoopeston, Visioning for the Future
Jacksonville, Jacksonville Main Street
Libertyville, Main Street Libertyville, Inc.
Lincoln, Main Street Lincoln
Lombard, Lombard Town Centre
Macomb, Macomb Downtown Development Corporation
Marengo, Marengo Main Street
Marion, Marion Main Street
Marshall, Main Street Marshall
Mascoutah, Main Street Mascoutah
Mendota, Mendota
Momence, Main Street Momence
Monticello, Monticello Main Street
Mt. Vernon, Downtown Mt. Vernon Development Corporation
Mundelein, Mundelein Main Street
Murphysboro, Murphysboro Main Street
O'Fallon, Main Street O`Fallon
Orion, Main Street Orion
Paris, Main Street Paris
Paxton, P.R.I.D.E. in Paxton, Inc.
Pekin, Pekin Main Street
Pittsfield, Pittsfield Main Street
Plainfield, MainStreet Plainfield, Inc.
Pontiac, Pontiac PROUD
Princeton, Main Street Princeton
Prophetstown, Prophetstown Main Street Program
Quincy, Historic Quincy Business District
Rock Island, Downtown Rock Island Arts & Entertainment
Rockford, River District Association
Rushville, Rushville Main Street
St. Charles, Downtown St. Charles Partnership
Taylorville, Taylorville Main Street, Inc.
Vandalia, Vandalia Main Street Program
Winfield, Main Street Winfield, Inc.
Woodstock, Woodstock Downtown Business Association

Indiana
Alexandria, Alexandria Community Vision, ACV
Anderson, Anderson Indiana Main Street
Arcadia, Arcadia Merchants & Associates dba Arcadia Communi
Atlanta, Town of Atlanta
Attica, Attica Main Street
Aurora, Main Street Aurora
Bedford, Bedford Revitalization, Inc.
Berne, Berne Community Development Corporation
Bloomington, Downtown Bloomington, Inc.
Bremen, Bremen Revitalization
Brookville, Brookville Main Street, Inc.
Cloverdale, Cloverdale Main Street
Corydon, Main Street Corydon
Crawfordsville, Crawfordsville Main Street
Delphi, Delphi Main Street Association
Elkhart, Downtown Elkhart, Inc.
Ellettsville, Ellettsville Main Street, Inc.
Evansville, Growth Alliance for Greater Evansville
Farmland, Historic Farmland USA
Ferdinand, Ferdinand Merchants/Ferdinand Tourism
Frankfort, Frankfort Main Street
Franklin, Discover Downtown Franklin
Greenfield, Greenfield/Hancock County Chamber of Commerce
Greensburg, Heart of the Tree City
Greentown, Greentown Main Street Association, Inc.
Greenwood, Restore Old Town Greenwood INC.
Indianapolis, Indianapolis Downtown, Inc.
Jasper, Jasper Chamber of Commerce
Jeffersonville, Jeffersonville Main Street, Inc.
Kokomo, Kokomo Downtown Association
Lafayette, Greater Lafayette Commerce
Lawrenceburg, Lawrenceburg Main Street, Inc.
Lebanon, Lebanon Vitalization, Inc.
Logansport, Logan's Landing Association
Madison, Madison Main Street Program, First hosted a visit of Lockwood Martling from the U.S. Department of Housing and Urban Development in 1970. Later became one of three original "Main Street Project" communities in the US, run by Historic Madison, Inc. first founded in 1960. Madison was one of 10 semifinalists for the "Main Street Project" in 1977 and ultimately selected. Tom Moriarity, director of Historic Madison, Inc. worked for the National Trust for Historic Preservation between 1977 and 1979 as part of the "Main Street Project."
Marion, Main Street Marion
Martinsville, Rediscover Historic Martinsville
Michigan City, Michigan City Main Street Association
Mitchell, Mitchell on the Move
Morocco, Morocco Main Street, Inc.
Morristown, Morristown Visionary Committee, Inc.
Muncie, Muncie Downtown Development Partnership
Nappanee, Nappanee Main & Market
New Albany, Develop New Albany, Inc.
New Harmony, New Harmony Business Associates
Newburgh, Historic Newburgh, Inc.
Noblesville, Noblesville Main Street, Inc.
Peru, Miami County Chamber of Commerce
Plainfield, Town of Plainfield
Plymouth, Plymouth Main Street
Remington and Wolcott, Remington Wolcott Community Development Corp
Rensselaer, Main Street Rensselaer
Richmond, Main Street Richmond
Rising Sun, Historic Downtown
Rushville, The Heart of Rushville, Inc.
Seymour, Seymour Main Street
Shelbyville, Mainstreet Shelbyville, Inc.
Sheridan, Sheridan Main Street
Terre Haute, Downtown Terre Haute, Inc.
Upland, Our Town Upland, Inc.
Valparaiso, Valparaiso Community
Vevay, Vevay Main Street, Inc.
Wabash, Wabash Marketplace, Inc.
Wakarusa, Town of Wakarusa
Walton, Walton Main Street Organization Corp.
Warsaw, Warsaw Community Development
Winchester, Winchester Main Street

Iowa
Ames, Ames Main Street
Avoca, Avoca Main Street
Belle Plaine, Belle Plaine Community Development Corp
Bloomfield, Bloomfield Main Street
Burlington, Downtown Partners, Inc.
Cedar Falls, Cedar Falls Community Main Street
Cedar Rapids, Czech Village-New Bohemia
Centerville, Main street Centerville
Central City, Central City Main street
Chariton, Chariton Area Chamber of Commerce/ Main Street
Charles City, Charles City Community Revitalization
Clarence, Clarence Main Street
Colfax, Colfax Main Street
Conrad, Conrad Chamber-Main Street
Coon Rapids, Main Street Coon Rapids
Corning, Main Street Corning
Davenport, Hilltop Campus Village Main Street
Des Moines, 6th Avenue Corridor
Dubuque, Dubuque Main Street
Dunlap, Dunlap Community Development Corporation
Elkader, Main Street Elkader
Fort Dodge, Fort Dodge Main Street
Greenfield, Greenfield Chamber-Main Street
Grundy Center, Main Street Grundy Center
Guthrie Center, Main Street Guthrie Center
Hampton, Main Street Hampton
Iowa Falls, Iowa Falls Chamber Main Street
Jefferson, Jefferson Matters: A Main Street & Chamber Community
Jewell, Jewell Main Street
Keokuk, Main Street Keokuk, Inc.
Lansing, Main Street Lansing
Le Mars, Main Street Le Mars
Marcus, Marcus Main Street
Marshalltown, Marshalltown CBD/Main Street
Mason City, Mason City Downtown Association
Mount Pleasant, Main Street Mount Pleasant
Mount Vernon, Mount Vernon Community Development
Nevada, Main Street Nevada
Newton, Newton Main Street
New Hampton, New Hampton Main Street
Osceola, Osceola Chamber-Main Street
Oskaloosa, Main Street Oskaloosa
Ottumwa, Ottumwa Progress/Main Street Ottumwa
Sac City, Sac City Chamber-Main Street
Spencer, Spencer Main Street Company
State Center, State Center Development Association
Story City, Story City Greater Chamber Connection
Washington, Main Street Washington
Waterloo, Main Street Waterloo
Waverly, Waverly Area Development Group
West Branch, Main Street West Branch
West Des Moines, Historic Valley Junction Foundation
West Union, Main Street West Union
Woodbine, Woodbine Main Street

Kansas
Augusta, Downtown Augusta, Inc.
Belleville, Belleville Main Street
Chanute, Main Street Chanute, Inc.
Coffeyville, Downtown Coffeyville, Inc.
El Dorado, El Dorado Main Street
Emporia, Emporia Main Street
Garden City, Garden City Downtown Vision
Hoisington, Hoisington Main Street, Inc.
Holton, Holton Main Street
Hutchinson, The Downtown Hutchinson Revitalization Partnership
Independence, Independence Main Street
Leavenworth, Leavenworth Main Street Program, Inc.
Manhattan, Downtown Manhattan, Inc.
Marysville, Marysville Main Street
McPherson, McPherson Main Street
Ottawa, Ottawa Main Street
Parsons, Downtown Parsons, Inc., a team from the Kansas Department of Economic Development Main Street Program visited in May 1986. They met with "Mainstreet PRIDE" Board of Directors.
Peabody, Peabody Main Street Association
Phillipsburg, Discover Phillipsburg Main Street
Russell, Russell Main Street
Seneca, Seneca Downtown Impact, Inc.
Stafford, Stafford Main Street
Sterling, Main Street Sterling
Wamego, Wamego Main Street
Winfield, Winfield Main Street

Kentucky

Barbourville, Barbourville Main Street
Bardstown, Bardstown Main Street Program
Bellevue, City of Bellevue
Cadiz, Cadiz Main Street
Campbellsville, Main Street Program
Carrollton, Carrollton Main Street
Covington, Renaissance Covington
Cumberland, Tri-Cities Heritage Development Corporation
Cynthiana, Cynthiana Main Street
Danville, Heart of Danville, Inc.
Dawson Springs, Dawson Springs Main
Dayton, Dayton Main Street
Frankfort, Downtown Frankfort, Inc.
Georgetown, Georgetown Main Street
Guthrie, Kentucky Guthrie, Guthrie Main Street
Harrodsburg, Harrodsburg First, Inc.
Henderson, Downtown Henderson Project
La Grange, Discover Downtown La Grange
Lebanon, Lebanon/Marion Main Street
London, London Downtown
Marion, Marion Main Street
Maysville, Maysville Main Street
Middlesboro, Discover Downtown Middlesboro, Inc.
Morehead, Downtown Morehead Inc
Mt. Washington, Kentucky Mt. Washington  Mt. Washington Main Street
Murray, Murray Main Street
New Castle, New Castle Main Street
Nicholasville, Nicholasville Now
Paducah, Paducah Main Street
Paintsville, Paintsville Main Street
Paris, Paris Main Street
Perryville, Perryville Main Street
Pikeville, Pikeville Main Street 
Pineville, Pineville Main Street
Princeton, Princeton Main Street 
Russellville, Main Street Russellville, Inc.
Salyersville, Salyersville Main Street
Scottsville, Heart of Scottsville
Shelbyville, Shelby Main Street
Springfield, Springfield Main Street
Taylorsville, Taylorsville Main Street
Wayland, Kentucky Wayland, Wayland Main Street
Williamsburg, Williamsburg Main Street
Winchester, Winchester Main Street

Louisiana
The Louisiana Main Street Program is within the Office of Cultural Development and the Division of Historic Preservation. Established in 1984, there are presently 24 designated Main Street Programs in Louisiana.

Designated Programs
Abbeville, Abbeville Main Street
Bastrop, Bastrop Main Street
Columbia, Main Street Columbia
Crowley, Crowley Main Street
Denham Springs, Denham Springs Main Street
DeRidder, DeRidder Main Street
Donaldsonville, Donaldsonville Downtown Development District
Eunice, Eunice Main Street
Franklin, Franklin Main Street
Hammond, Hammond Downtown Dev District
Homer, Main Street Homer
Houma, Houma Downtown Development Corporation
Kenner, Rivertown Main Street
Leesville, Leesville Main Street
Minden, Minden Main Street
Monroe, Downtown Monroe Alliance
Morgan City, Morgan City Main Street
Natchitoches, Natchitoches Main Street
New Iberia, New Iberia Main Street
New Orleans - Broad Street, Broad Community Connections
New Orleans - North Rampart Street, North Rampart Main Street, Inc.
New Orleans - O.C. Haley Boulevard, O.C. Haley Main Street
New Orleans - Old Algiers, Old Algiers Main Street Corporation
New Roads, New Roads Main Street
Opelousas, Main Street Opelousas
Plaquemine, Plaquemine Main Street
Ponchatoula, Ponchatoula Main Street
Ruston, City of Ruston Main Street
Slidell, St. Tammany Chamber of Commerce, Olde Towne Slidell Main Street
Springhill, Springhill Main Street Program
St. Francisville, St. Francisville Main Street
St. Martinville, St. Martinville Main Street
Thibodaux, Thibodaux Main Street
Winnsboro, Winnsboro Main Street

Non-Designated Programs
Bogalusa, Bogalusa Downtown Development
Clinton, Clinton Main Street Association
New Orleans - Oak Street, Oak Street Association
New Orleans - St. Claude Avenue, St. Claude Main Street

Maine
The Maine Development Foundation serves as the coordinating program for Maine. In August 2018, Main Street Maine communities launched a website to share authentic Maine downtown experiences, featuring businesses and attractions in each city and town with the National Main Street designation.

Main Street Maine Communities
Augusta, Augusta Downtown Alliance
Bath, Main Street Bath
Belfast, Our Town Belfast
Biddeford, Heart of Biddeford
Brunswick, Brunswick Downtown Association
Gardiner, Gardiner Main Street
Rockland, Rockland Main Street
Saco, Saco Main Street
Skowhegan, Main Street Skowhegan
Westbrook, Discover Downtown Westbrook

Maine Downtown Affiliates
Eastport, Eastport for Pride
Norway, Norway Downtown Revitalization

Maryland
Aberdeen, City of Aberdeen
Annapolis, City of Annapolis
Baltimore - Belair-Edison, Belair-Edison Main Street
Baltimore - Brooklyn, Brooklyn Main Street
Baltimore - Federal Hill, Federal Hill Main Street
Baltimore - Fells Point, Fells Point Development Corporation
Baltimore - Govanstowne, Govanstowne Business Association
Baltimore - Hamilton-Lauraville, Hamilton-Lauraville Main Street
Baltimore - Highlandtown, Highlandtown Main Street Program
Baltimore - East Monument Street, Historic East Monument Street
Baltimore - Pennsylvania Avenue, Pennsylvania Avenue
Baltimore - Washington Village, Pigtown Main Street
Baltimore - Waverly, Waverly Main Street
Bel Air, Bel Air Downtown Alliance
Berlin, Town of Berlin
Brunswick, Brunswick Main Street, Inc.
Cambridge, Cambridge Main Street
Chestertown, Downtown Chestertown Association
Cumberland, Cumberland Downtown
Denton, Town of Denton
Dundalk, Dundalk Renaissance Corporation
Easton, Easton Main Street
Elkton, Elkton Chamber and Alliance
Frederick, Downtown Frederick Partnership
Frostburg, Frostburg Main Street
Havre de Grace, Havre de Grace Main Street, Inc.
Middletown, Town of Middletown
Mount Airy, Mount Airy Main Street Association
Oakland, Oakland Main Street
Princess Anne, Downtown Princess Anne Partnership
Sykesville, Downtown Sykesville Connection
Salisbury, Urban Salisbury, Inc.
Takoma Park, Old Takoma Business Association
Taneytown, Taneytown Main Street Program
Thurmont, Thurmont Main Street
Westminster, The City of Westminster

Massachusetts
After the "Main Street Project" concluded in 1979, Massachusetts was one of the first six states selected for establishment of a statewide coordinating program. At the time of founding banking industry leaders held two conferences to discuss innovative financing programs. Under the leadership of then Boston Mayor Thomas Menino, a citywide coordinating program was established in Boston. This has since grown to include 22 designated Main Street programs in Boston.

Allston, Allston Village Main Streets
Boston - Chinatown, Chinatown Main Street
Boston - Mission Hill, Mission Hill Main Streets
Boston - Washington Gateway, Washington Gateway Main Street
Brighton, Brighton Main Streets
Dorchester - Bowdoin/Geneva Main Streets
Dorchester - Fields Corner Main Street
Dorchester - Greater Ashmont Main Street
Dorchester - Four Corners Main Street
Dorchester - Grove Hall Main Street
Dorchester - St. Mark's, St. Mark's Area Main Street
Dorchester - Uphams Corner/Dorchester Bay, Upham's Corner Main Street
East Boston, East Boston Gateway, Inc.
Hyde Park, Hyde Park Main Street, Inc.
Jamaica Plain - Centre/South, Centre/South Main Streets
Jamaica Plain - Hyde/Jackson Square, Hyde/Jackson Square Main Streets
Roslindale, Roslindale Village Main Street
Roxbury - Nubian Square (formerly Dudley Square), Dudley Square Main Street
Roxbury - Egleston Square, Egleston Square Main Street
West Roxbury, West Roxbury Main Streets
Somerville, East Somerville Main Streets
Somerville, Union Square Main Streets

Michigan
Boyne City, Boyne City Main Street Program
Calumet, Main Street Calumet
Clare, City of Clare
Detroit - Corktown's Michigan Avenue Business District, Greater Corktown Development Corporation
Detroit - East Warren Businesses United U-SNAP-BAC, Inc.
Detroit - Grandmont Rosedale Business District, Grandmont/Rosedale Development Corporation
Detroit - Jefferson East Business District, Jefferson East Business Association
Detroit - Mexicantown, Mexicantown Hubbard
Detroit - Seven Mile, Arab-American & Chaldean Council
Detroit - Southeast Gratiot Avenue Business District, Gratiot McDougall United CDC
Detroit - University Commons Business District, University Commons District
Farmington, Farmington DDA
Ferndale, Ferndale DDA
Franklin, Village of Franklin
Grand Haven, Grand Haven Main Street
Hart, Hart Main Street
Highland Township - Highland Station, Highland Township DDA
Holly, Village of Holly DDA
Howell, Howell Main Street Project
Iron Mountain, Iron Mountain Main Street
Ishpeming, Ishpeming Main Street Program
Keego Harbor, City of Keego Harbor
Lake Orion, Village of Lake Orion DDA
Lansing, Downtown Lansing
Lansing, Old Town Lansing
Manistee, Manistee Main Street/DDA
Marshall, Marshall Main Street. When the National Trust for Historic Preservation was developing a program for downtown revitalization in the 1970s, Marshall is one of three towns frequently cited as a success story.
Midland, Midland Downtown Development
Muskegon, Muskegon Main Street
Niles, Niles DDA Main Street Program
Ortonville, Ortonville DDA
Oxford, Oxford DDA
Pontiac, City of Pontiac DDA
Portland, Main Street Portland
Rochester, Rochester DDA
Scottville, Scottville Main Street
Walled Lake, Walled Lake DDA

Minnesota
A unique approach has been taken in Minnesota to rebrand the Preservation Alliance of Minnesota as "Rethos" - a 501c3 non-profit that works with Main Street communities but also neighborhood groups, developers, and homeowners. 

Designated Communities
Albert Lea
Faribault, Faribault Main Street, since 2013
Mankato, City Center Mankato, eighth designated community in November 2017
Northfield
Olivia
Owatonna
Red Wing, Red Wing Downtown Main Street
Shakopee
Wabasha
Willmar, Willmar Design Center
Winona, in June 1974 a workshop "Heritage is a Verb: a Public Workshop on Historic Preservation" featured Mary Means, field staff, National Trust for Historic Preservation. Following the workshop a tour of the Latsch Building with the committee to Save Historic Winona occurred.

Network Communities
Bird Island
Braham
Jackson
Lanesboro
Litchfield
Luverne
Sauk Centre
Sleepy Eye, Sleepy Eye Economic Development Authority

Other Communities
Brainerd, Brainerd Main Street
New Ulm

Mississippi
The Mississippi Main Street Association was established in 1984 as a 501(c)(3) non-profit organization headquartered in Jackson, Mississippi. Mississippi Main Street serves as the coordinating program for 48 designated Main Street programs in Mississippi. Thomas Gregory currently serves as the executive director and state coordinator for the Mississippi Main Street Association. Previous state coordinators include Bob Wilson, Beverly Meng, and Scott Barksdale. Below is a list of Mississippi's designated Main Street programs.

Aberdeen, Aberdeen Main Street
Amory, Amory Main Street, Inc.
Baldwyn, Baldwyn Main Street Association
Batesville, Batesville Main Street Program
Biloxi, Biloxi Main Street
Booneville, Booneville Main Street Association
Byhalia, Byhalia Area Chamber Main Street
Cleveland, Team Cleveland Main Street
Clinton, Main Street Clinton
Columbia, Columbia Main Street, Inc.
Columbus, Columbus Main Street, Inc.
Corinth, Main Street Corinth
Crystal Springs, Main Street Crystal Springs
Greenville, Main Street Greenville
Greenwood, Main Street Greenwood, Inc.
Gulfport, Gulfport Main Street Association
Hattiesburg, Downtown Hattiesburg Association
Hernando, Hernando Main Street Chamber
Holly Springs, Holly Springs Main Street
Indianola, Indianola Main Street Chamber
Itawamba County, Itawamba County Main Street
Kosciusko, Kosciusko Main Street
Laurel, Laurel Main Street
Leake County, Leake County Main Street Chamber
Louisville, Louisville Main Street
Meridian, Meridian Main Street
Moss Point, Moss Point Main Street Association
Natchez, Downtown Natchez Alliance
Nettleton, Nettleton Main Street
New Albany, New Albany Main Street
Ocean Springs, Ocean Springs Main Street
Okolona, Okolona Main Street Chamber
Pascagoula, Main Street Pascagoula
Pearl, Main Street Pearl
Philadelphia, Philadelphia Main Street Association
Picayune, Picayune Main Street
Pontotoc County, Pontotoc County Main Street
Ripley, Ripley Main Street Association
Saltillo, Saltillo Main Street
Senatobia, Senatobia Main Street Partnership
Starkville, Starkville Main Street
Sumrall, Sumrall Main Street
Tunica, Tunica Main Street, Inc.
Tupelo, Downtown Tupelo Main Street Association
Vicksburg, Vicksburg Main Street
Water Valley, Water Valley Main Street
West Point, West Point Main Street
Woodville, Woodville/Wilkinson County Main Street

Missouri

Missouri has over 160 commercial districts participating in Missouri Main Street. A state-wide non-profit organization was formed in 2004 and recognizes communities in the following categories: Accredited, Associate, Affiliate, and Aspiring. There are 7 accredited communities with the highest level of designation. Gayla Roten has been State Director since November 2007. She is assisted in that role by a staff of six.

Accredited Communities
Cape Girardeau, Old Town Cape, Inc.
Chillicothe, Main Street Chillicothe
Excelsior Springs, Downtown Excelsior Partnership, Inc.
Lee's Summit, Downtown Lee's Summit, Inc.
Liberty, Historic Downtown Liberty
Warrensburg, Warrensburg Main Street
Washington, Downtown Washington, Inc.

Associate Communities
Blue Springs
Clinton, Clinton Main Street, Inc.
Independence
Joplin

Affiliate Communities
Albany
Ashland
Belton
Brookfield
Brunswick
Butler
Cameron
Campbell
Canton
Carthage
Concordia
Dutchtown
Fayette
Festus
Glasgow, Glasgow Main Street
Grandview
Harrisonville
Jackson
Kearney
Kirksville
Knob Noster
Lebanon
Marceline
Maryville
Moberly
Monroe City
Nixa
Odessa
Ozark, Ozark Main Street Program
Pacific
Parkville
Pleasant Hill
Sikeston, Historic Midtown Development Group Inc
Smithville
Sparta
St. Joseph. In 1974 Mary Means then serving as field services for the National Trust for Historic Preservation spoke to a group at the Chamber of Commerce in St. Joseph. This was among the earliest times a suggestion was made to revitalize a commercial area using preservation as a tool. The warehouse area on 4th Street, Francis to Jule St, was recommended "as a possible historical shopping area ripe for development."
Trenton
Warrenton
Willow Springs

Other Communities
Louisiana, Louisiana Economic Development Committee
Nevada, Main Street Nevada
Warsaw, Warsaw Main Street, Inc.
West Plains, Downtown West Plains

Montana
Montana Main Street Program was established in 2005 as a collaborative effort between the Community Development Division and the Montana Office of Tourism at the Department of Commerce. Three pilot projects for the program were selected in 2006: Anaconda, Polson, and Red Lodge. Joining them a few years latter were Libby, STevensville, Butte, and Livingston to bring the total up to seven. In 2013 Governor Steve Bullock brought together the Community Development Division of the Montana Office of Tourism and the Montana Department of Commerce in a new effort to help revitalize historic downtowns in Montana, after the Montana Main Street Program had been cut in the 2013 Legislative Session. At the time twenty-one communities were participating in the program.

Certified Programs
Butte, Mainstreet Uptown Butte, Inc., member since 2008
Stevensville, Stevensville Main Street Association, member since 2008

Affiliate Programs
Anaconda, Anaconda Main Street Program, selected as one of three pilot projects for the Montana Main Street Program on April 6, 2006.
Baker, member since 2020
Billings, member since 2010
Boulder, member since 2011
Deer Lodge, member since 2012
Ekalaka, member since 2020
Ennis, member since 2018
Glasgow, member since 2008
Glendive, member since 2010
Hamilton, member since 2014
Hardin, member since 2009
Havre, member since 2020
Helena, member since 2013
Libby, Libby Revitalization, Inc., member since 2010
Lincoln, member since 2020
Livingston, Vision Livingston Downtown Partnership, member since 2019
Miles City, member since 2013
Polson, Polson CDA - Main Street Project, selected as one of three pilot projects for the Montana Main Street Program on April 6, 2006.
Red Lodge, Red Lodge Economic Development Corporation. Revitalization plan was created in 1986. Selected as one of three pilot projects for the Montana Main Street Program on April 6, 2006.
Terry, member since 2012
Thompson Falls, member since 2014
Townsend, member since 2008
Twin Bridges, member since 2015
Whitehall, member since 2010

Nebraska
Alliance, Historic Alliance Main Street
Beatrice, Main Street Beatrice, Inc.
Elkhorn - Elkhorn Station, Elkhorn Station Main Street
Falls City - Falls City Main Street
Fremont, MainStreet of Fremont, Inc.
Geneva, Revitalize Geneva
Grand Island, Downtown Grand Island Main Street
Kearney, Downtown Kearney: The Bricks
Nebraska City, Nebraska City Main Street
Plattsmouth, Plattsmouth Main Street
Sidney, Historic Downtown Sidney
Wayne, Main Street Wayne
York, York Towne Centre Main Street

Nevada
No designated programs

New Hampshire
Berlin, Berlin Main Street
Colebrook, Colebrook Downtown Development Association
Concord, Main Street Concord, Inc.
Dover, Dover Main Street
Enfield, Enfield Village Association
Goffstown, Goffstown Main Street Program, Inc.
Hillsborough, Hillsborough Pride
Jaffrey, T.E.A.M. Jaffrey
Laconia, Main Street Laconia
Lisbon, Lisbon Main Street, Inc.
Littleton, Littleton Main Street
Meredith, Greater Meredith Program, Inc.
Nashua, Great American Downtown, Inc.
Ossipee, Ossipee Revitalization Group, Inc.
Plymouth, Main Street Plymouth, Inc.
Rochester, Rochester Main Street
Somersworth, Somersworth Main Street
Tilton, Tilton Main Street
Wilton, Wilton Main Street Association

New Jersey
New Jersey has two Great American Main Street Award winners: Westfield (2004) and Montclair (2015). Today the Main Street New Jersey coordinating program is operated by the New Jersey Department of Community Affairs in Trenton, New Jersey.

Atlantic City - Atlantic Avenue, Main Street Atlantic City
Boonton, Boonton Main Street
Bridgeton, Bridgeton Main Street Association
Burlington, Main Street Burlington
Caldwell, Caldwell Downtown Alliance
Camden - Broadway, Broadway Main Street
Camden - Fairview, Fairview Main Street
Englewood, Englewood Main Street Program
Glassboro, Borough of Glassboro
Hammonton, Main Street Hammonton
Highland Park, Main Street Highland Park
Jersey City - Monticello Avenue, Monticello Community
Lawrenceville, Lawrenceville Main Street
Maple Shade, Main Street Maple Shade
Merchantville, Main Street Merchantville
Metuchen, Metuchen Downtown Alliance
Millville, Main Street Millville
Montclair, Montclair Center Improvement District
Mount Holly, Main Street Mount Holly
New Egypt, Main Street New Egypt
Newton, Main Street Newton, Inc.
Ocean City, Main Street Ocean City
Orange, Orange Main Street/City of Orange
Red Bank, Red Bank RiverCenter
Salem, Salem Main Street/Stand Up for Salem
Somerville, Somerville District Management Corporation
South Amboy, City of South Amboy
South Orange, Main Street South Orange, Inc.
Trenton - Capitol South, Capital South Main Street
Vineland, Main Street Vineland - VDID
West Orange, Downtown West Orange Alliance
Westfield, Downtown Westfield Corporation
Wildwood, Main Street Wildwood, Inc.
Woodbury, Main Street Woodbury

New Mexico
Alamogordo Alamogordo MainStreet
Albuquerque - Albuquerque Downtown, Downtown Action Team, Nob Hill MainStreet
Artesia, Artesia MainStreet, Inc.
Bernalillo, Bernalillo Main Street Association
Belen  Belen MainStreet
Carlsbad, Carlsbad MainStreet Project
Clayton, Clayton MainStreet
Clovis, Clovis MainStreet
Corrales, Corrales Main Street, Inc.
Deming, Deming Main Street
Farmington, Farmington Downtown Association
Gallup Gallup MainStreet 
Grants, Grants MainStreet Project
Harding County, New Mexico Harding County MainStreet
Hobbs, MainStreet Hobbs, Inc.
Las Cruces, Downtown Las Cruces Partnership
Las Vegas, MainStreet Las Vegas
Los Alamos, Los Alamos MainStreet Future
Lovington, Lovington Main Street
Portales, Portales Main Street Program
Raton, Raton Main Street
Roswell, MainStreet Roswell
Santa Rosa - Downtown, Santa Rosa Main Street
Silver City, Silver City MainStreet Project
Tucumcari, Tucumcari MainStreet
Truth or Consequences  MainStreet Truth or Consequences
Zuni Pueblo

New York
New York is one of the few states in the US that does not have a state coordinating program officially recognized by Main Street America. That has not prevented a number of communities from pursuing downtown revitalization, with several that have faithfully followed the Main Street Approach.

Non-Designated Programs
Albion, Albion Main Street Alliance
Castleton-on-Hudson, Castleton-on-Hudson Main Street Association
Cazenovia,  When the National Trust for Historic Preservation was developing a program for downtown revitalization in the 1970s, Cazenovia is one of three towns frequently cited as a success story.
Corning, Gaffer District. Home of Corning Glass Works and the prototype in the 1970s for downtown revitalizations programs that followed nationwide. Cited as an early success story for efforts to revitalize the downtown following a major flood.
Ithaca, Downtown Ithaca. Mary Means, field staff member of the National Trust for Historic Preservation visited and gave a talk on "Conservation of Townscape" on April 10, 1976.
Lockport, Lockport Downtown, Inc.
Lyons, Lyons Main Street
Oyster Bay, Oyster Bay Main Street Association

North Carolina
Albemarle, Albemarle Downtown Development Corporation
Belmont, Downtown Belmont, Inc.
Boone, Downtown Boone Development Association
Brevard, Heart of Brevard, Inc.
Burlington, Burlington Downtown Development Corporation
Clayton, Clayton Downtown Development Assoc.
Clinton, City of Clinton
Concord, Concord Downtown Development Corporation
Cullowhee, CuRvE (Cullowhee Revitalization Endeavor)
Davidson
Eden, City of Eden
Edenton, Destination Downtown Edenton
Elizabeth City, Elizabeth City Downtown, Inc.
Elkin, Town of Elkin
Farmville, Farmville Downtown Partnership
Forest City, Town of Forest City
Franklin, Franklin Main Street
Fuquay-Varina, Fuquay-Varina Revitalization Association
Garner, Garner Revitalization Association
Goldsboro, Downtown Goldsboro
Henderson, City of Henderson
Hendersonville, Downtown Hendersonville, Inc.
Hertford, Historic Hertford, Inc.
Hickory, Hickory Downtown Development Association
Kings Mountain
Kinston, Pride of Kinston, Inc.
Lenoir, City of Lenoir
Lexington, Uptown Lexington, Inc.
Lincolnton, City of Lincolnton
Lumberton, Lumberton Main Street Program
Marion, Marion Downtown Business Association
Mocksville, Davie County Community Development Corporation
Monroe, Downtown Monroe, Inc.
Mooresville, Mooresville Downtown Commission
Morehead City, Downtown Morehead City
Morganton, City of Morganton
New Bern, Swiss Bear, Inc.
Newton, City of Newton Main Street Program
North Wilkesboro, Historic Downtown North Wilkesboro
Oxford, City of Oxford
Reidsville, Reidsville Downtown
Roanoke Rapids, Roanoke Avenue Business Alliance
Rocky Mount, City of Rocky Mount Main Street Program
Roxboro, Roxboro Uptown Development Corporation
Rutherford, Rutherford Town Revitalization
Salisbury, Downtown Salisbury, Inc.
Sanford, Downtown Sanford
Shelby, Uptown Shelby Association, Inc.
Smithfield, Downtown Smithfield Development Corporation
Southport, Southport 2000
Sparta, Sparta Revitalization Committee
Spruce Pine, Spruce Pine Main Street Program
Statesville, Downtown Statesville
Sylva, Sylva Partners in Renewal, Inc.
Tarboro, Town of Tarboro
Wadesboro, Uptown Wadesboro, Inc.
Wake Forest, Wake Forest Downtown Revitalization Association
Washington, City of Washington
Waynesville, Downtown Waynesville Association
Wilson, Wilson Downtown

North Dakota
No designated programs

Ohio
Cambridge, Cambridge Main Street
Cleveland - Historic Gateway, Historic Gateway Neighborhood Corporation
Cleveland - Warehouse District, Historic Warehouse District Development Corporation
Defiance, Defiance Development & Visitors Bureau
Delaware, Main Street Delaware, Inc.
Greenville, Main Street Greenville
Kent, Main Street Kent
Lakewood, Main Street Lakewood
Lorain, Main Street Lorain
Medina, Main Street Medina. When the National Trust for Historic Preservation was developing a program for downtown revitalization in the 1970s, Medina is one of three towns frequently cited as a success story.
Middletown, Downtown Middletown
Millersburg, Historic Millersburg
Mount Vernon, Main Street Mount Vernon
Norwalk, Main Street Norwalk
Piqua, Main Street Piqua, Inc.
Portsmouth, Main Street Portsmouth
Sandusky, Sandusky Main Street Association
Tiffin, Main Street Tiffin - SIEDC
Troy, Troy Main Street
Van Wert, Main Street Van Wert
Vermilion, Main Street Vermilion
Wadsworth, Main Street Wadsworth
Wooster, Main Street Wooster, Inc.

Oklahoma
Ada, Ada Main Street, Inc.
Altus, Main Street Altus
Ardmore, Ardmore Main Street Authority
Cherokee, Cherokee Main Street
Claremore, Claremore Main Street
Collinsville, Collinsville Downtown, Inc.
Duncan, Main Street Duncan, Inc.
Durant, Durant Main Street
El Reno, El Reno Main Street
Enid, Main Street Enid
Guymon, Main Street Guymon
Hobart, Hobart Main Street
Muskogee, Main Street Muskogee
Newkirk, Newkirk Main Street Authority
Oklahoma City - Stockyards City, Stockyards City Main Street
Okmulgee, Okmulgee Main Street
Perry, Perry Main Street
Ponca City, Ponca City Main Street
Poteau, Historic Downtown Poteau
Pryor, Pryor Main Street
Sapulpa, Sapulpa Main Street
Stillwater, Downtown Stillwater Association
Tahlequah, Tahlequah Main Street Association
Tulsa, East Tulsa Main Street
Tulsa, Historic Greenwood District Main Street
Tulsa - Tulsa Route 66 Main Street
Tulsa - Kendall Whittier, Kendall Whittier Main Street
Wilburton, Wilburton Main Street, Inc.
Woodward, Woodward Main Street
Yukon, Yukon 66 Main Street

Oregon

There are three levels of designation in Oregon: Performing Main Street, Transforming Downtown, and Exploring Downtown. Today they are 64 Main Street programs in Oregon.

Performing Main Street
Albany, Albany Downtown Association
Astoria, Astoria Downtown Historic District Association
Portland, Alberta Main Street
Corvallis, Downtown Corvallis Association
Estacada, Estacada Development Association & Downtown Estacada Commission
La Grande, La Grande Main Street Downtown
McMinnville, McMinnville Downtown Association
Oregon City, Main Street Oregon City
Roseburg, Roseburg Town Center

Transforming Downtown
Bandon, Greater Bandon Association
Beaverton, Beaverton Downtown Association
Carlton, Carlton Business Association
Coos Bay, Coos Bay Downtown Association
Cottage Grove, Main Street Cottage Grove
Dallas, Dallas Downtown Association
Dayton, Dayton Community Development Association
Hillsboro, Hillsboro Downtown Partnership
Klamath Falls, Klamath Falls Downtown Association
Lebanon, Lebanon Downtown Association
Milton-Freewater, Milton-Freewater Downtown Alliance
Newberg, Newberg Downtown Coalition
Pendleton, Pendleton Downtown Association
Port Orford, Port Orford Main Street Revitalization Association
Tillamook, Tillamook Chamber of Commerce

Not Designated - May be Active or Inactive
Baker City, Historic Baker City, Inc.
Newberg, Newberg Downtown Coalition
The Dalles, The Dalles Main Street Program

Pennsylvania
After the "Main Street Project" concluded in 1979, Pennsylvania was one of the first six states selected for establishment of a statewide coordinating program. Today the Pennsylvania Downtown Center, founded in 1987, is the state coordinating program for Pennsylvania.
 Ambler, Pennsylvania, Ambler Main Street 
Ardmore - Lower Merion, The Ardmore Initiative
Ashland, Ashland Downtown Inc.
Bedford, Downtown Bedford, Inc.
Blairsville, Blairsville Downtown
Blossburg, Blossburg VIBE
Boyertown, Building a Better Boyertown
Bradford, Downtown Bradford
Bristol, D&L Landmark Towns
Canonsburg, Canonsburg Renaissance Committee
Carlisle, Downtown Carlisle Association
Chambersburg, Downtown Chambersburg, Inc.
Cheltenham - Cheltenham Township, Cheltenham Township Main Street
Clearfield, Pennsylvania, Clearfield Revitalization Corporation.
Collegeville, Collegeville Economic Development Corp.
Danville, Danville Business Alliance
DuBois, Downtown DuBois Revitalization Group
East Stroudsburg, Eastburg Community Alliance
Easton, Easton Main Street Initiative
Ebensburg, Ebensburg Area Business Comm.
Elizabethtown, Elizabethtown Main Street
Elkins Park - Cheltenham, Cheltenham Township Main Street
Emmaus, Emmaus Main Street
Ephrata, Downtown Ephrata, Inc.
Etna, Etna Economic Development Corp
Gettysburg, Main Street Gettysburg, Inc.
Greensburg, Greensburg Community Development Corp
Grove City, Olde Town Grove City
Hamburg, Our Town Foundation
Hollidaysburg, Borough of Hollidaysburg
Indiana, Downtown Indiana, Inc.
Irwin, The Irwin Project
Jenkintown, Jenkintown Community Alliance
Johnstown, Johnstown Main Street
Kennett Square, Historic Kennett Square
Kutztown, Kutztown Community Partnership
Lansdowne, Lansdowne Economic Development Corporation
Latrobe, Latrobe Community Revitalization Program
Lehigh County-Northampton, County of Lehigh
Lewisburg, Lewisburg Downtown Partnership
Lewistown, Lewistown Main Street
Lititz, Venture Lititz, Inc.
Lock Haven, Downtown Lock Haven, Inc.
Lycoming County, Our Towns 2010
Manheim, Manheim Downtown Development Group
Meyersdale, Meyersdale Renaissance, Inc.
Middletown, Greater Middletown Economic Development Corporation
Mifflinburg, Mifflinburg Heritage Revitalization
Millvale, Millvale Main Street
Milton, The Improved Milton Experience
Montrose, Montrose Restoration Committee
Mount Joy, Main Street Mount Joy
Mt. Lebanon - Washington Road, Mt. Lebanon Municipality
Newtown, Joint Downtown Newtown Corporation
Northern Dauphin County, Northern Dauphin Revitalization Project
Oxford, Oxford Main Street
Penbrook, Penbrook Revitalization, Inc.
Philadelphia - Allegheny West, Allegheny West Foundation
Philadelphia - East Passyunk, East Passyunk Avenue Business Improvement District
Philadelphia - Frankford, Frankford CDC
Philadelphia - H.A.C.E., HACE-Hispanic Association of Contractors & Enterprises
Philadelphia - Lancaster Avenue, Peoples Emergency Center
Philadelphia - Mount Airy, Mt. Airy USA
Philadelphia - Roxborough-Ridge Avenue, Roxborough Development Corporation
Philipsburg, Philipsburg Main Street Program
Phoenixville, Phoenixville Main Street
Pittsburgh - Bloomfield, Bloomfield Business Association
Pittsburgh - East Carson, Main Street on East Carson
Pittsburgh - Friendship, Friendship Development Associates, Inc
Pittsburgh - Lawrenceville, Lawrenceville Corporation
Pittsburgh - Mount Washington, Mt. Washington Community Development Corporation
Pittsburgh - North Side, Northside Leadership Conference
Pittsburgh - Strip District, Neighbors In The Strip
Pottstown, Pottstown Downtown Improvement
Pottsville, Pottsville Area Development Corporation
Quakertown, Quakertown Alive!
Ridgway, Ridgway Heritage Council
Saxonburg, John Roebling's Historic Saxonburg
Selinsgrove, Selinsgrove Projects, Inc.
Shenandoah, Downtown Shenandoah, Inc.
Somerset, Somerset, Inc.
Souderton-Telford, Souderton-Telford Main Streets
State College, Downtown Improvement District
Susquehanna Depot, The Trehab Center
Tamaqua, Downtown Tamaqua
Telford-Souderton, Mr. D. Bradley Price
Uniontown, Uniontown Downtown Business
Upper Schuylkill, Upper Schuylkill Downtowns
Vandergrift, Vandergrift Improvement Program
Warren, Warren Co.-Forest EOC Main Street Program
Warren, Warren Main Street
Washington, Washington Business District
Waynesboro, Main Street Waynesboro
Waynesburg, Waynesburg Prosperous & Beautiful
West Chester, West Chester BID
West Newton, Downtown West Newton Inc.
West Reading, West Reading Main Street
Williamsport, Our Towns 2010
York, Main Street York, Inc.

Rhode Island
No designated programs

South Carolina
The South Carolina Downtown Development Association was formed as a private, nonprofit organization in 1984. Five of the original towns in the South Carolina Main Street Program named in 1984 were Sumter, Chester, Union, Lancaster, and Georgetown. In 1985 they were joined by five more towns: Clinton, Beaufort, Gaffney, Greer, and Seneca. Another five cities were named to the program in 1986: Anderson, Bennettsville, Camden, Conway, and Darlington. A call went out in 1999 for "1,000 Friends of South Carolina" to support the ongoing work of the South Carolina Downtown Development Association. That call for supporters reflected on the effectiveness of a grassroots approach to achieve community revitalization over the past 16 years.

Designated Communities
Beaufort, Main Street Beaufort, USA
Bennettsville, Bennettsville Downtown
Florence, Florence Downtown Development Corporation
Great Falls, Great Falls Hometown Association
Hartsville, Hartsville Downtown Development Association
Lancaster, Lancaster - See Lancaster
Laurens, Main Street Laurens, USA
Manning, Main Street Manning, selected in January 2008 to participate in South Carolina Main Street program
Marion, Historic Marion Revitalization
Orangeburg, Downtown Orangeburg
Summerville, Summerville D.R.E.A.M.

Non-Designated Communities - may be active or inactive
Anderson
Camden
Chester
Conway
Darlington
Georgetown
Seneca, Michael Young was selected as the downtown director in January 1985 by the Seneca United Revitalization Efforts (SURE) committee.
Sumter
Union

South Dakota
One of the three original "Main Street Project" communities was in Hot Springs, South Dakota, from 1977-1979. As of 2021, however, there are no Main Street America designated programs in South Dakota, nor is there an active state coordinating program. Of the downtowns in South Dakota some follow the Main Street Approach, while others are a downtown association or chamber of commerce format.

Non-Designated Communities
Aberdeen, Aberdeen Downtown Association
Brookings, Downtown Brookings
Dell Rapids, Dell Rapids Chamber of Commerce
Deadwood, Deadwood Chamber of Commerce. Deadwood was one of the earliest communities to receive funding from the National Trust Historic Preservation in support of commercial district revitalization. As a precursor to the Main Street Program, in April 1974 architect Steven Stoltz, of the firm Steffan and Stoltz in Iowa, presented architectural drawings of buildings on Main Street with directions of what would be needed to restore each one. The state provided $15,250 and National Trust another $1,000.
Hot Springs, Hot Springs Chamber of Commerce. 
Huron, Huron Downtown Beautification Committee
Lead, Lead Downtown Revitalization Project
Mitchell, Mitchell Main Street and Beyond
Pierre, Historic Downtown Pierre Association
Rapid City, Downtown Rapid City. It is here that noted preservation expert Donovan Rypkema was an appraiser and owner of the Buell Building at 632 St. Joseph St. Rypkema would go on to have a distinctive career in historic preservation working extensively in the US and Internationally through his PlaceEconomics and Heritage Strategies International consulting firms.
Sioux Falls, Downtown Sioux Falls
Spearfish, Downtown Spearfish
Vermillion, Downtown Vermillion
Watertown, Watertown Urban Renewal District
Yankton, Historic Downtown Yankton

Tennessee
Bristol, Believe in Bristol/Bristol Main Street
Cleveland, Main Street Cleveland
Collierville, Main Street Collierville
Columbia, Columbia Main Street
Cookeville, Operation CityScape
Dandridge, Town of Dandridge
Dayton, Dayton Main Street Program
Dyersburg, Downtown Dyersburg
Fayetteville, Fayetteville Main Street
Franklin, Downtown Franklin Association
Gallatin, Greater Gallatin, Inc.
Greeneville, Main Street Greeneville, Inc
Jackson, Jackson Downtown Development Corporation
Johnson City, Johnson City
Kingsport, Downtown Kingsport Assoc.
Lawrenceburg, Main Street Lawrenceburg
McMinnville, Main Street McMinnville
Murfreesboro, Main Street: Murfreesboro
Rogersville, Rogersville Hawkins County
Savannah, Savannah Main Street Program
Tiptonville, Tiptonville Main Street
Union City, Main Street Union City

Texas
After the "Main Street Project" concluded in 1979, Texas one was one of the first six states selected for establishment of a statewide coordinating program. Texas Main Street was established under the Texas Historical Commission and based in Austin, Texas. In 1981, Seguin received a "Resource Team" that spent a week with business and civic leaders, bankers, elected officials, and the newly appointed Main Street Manager. Over the next 3 years plans to rehab several building were aided by a low-interest loan pool established by local banks. Anice Read led the program from the start until she retired in 1996. As of 2021, Debra Drescher leads a 9-person staff serving 88 communities.

Amarillo, Center City of Amarillo, Inc.
Bastrop, Bastrop Main Street Program
Bay City, Bay City Main Street
Beaumont, Beaumont Main Street, A Project of BUILD, Inc.
Beeville, Beeville Main Street Program
Brenham, City of Brenham
Bridgeport, Bridgeport Main Street Program
Brownsville, Brownsville Main Street Program
Buda, Buda Main Street Program
Caldwell, Caldwell Main Street Program
Canton, Canton Main Street Program
Canyon, Canyon Main Street
Carthage, Carthage Main Street
Celina, Celina Main Street Program
Childress, Childress Main Street Program
Clarksville, Clarksville Main Street
Clifton, Clifton Main Street
Colorado City, Colorado City Main Street Program
Corpus Christi, Corpus Christi Downtown Management District
Corsicana, Corsicana Main Street
Cotulla, Cotulla Main Street Program
Cuero, Cuero Main Street Program
Decatur, Decatur Main Street
Del Rio, City of Del Rio
Denison, Denison Main Street
Denton, City of Denton Downtown Development Program
Eagle Pass, Eagle Pass Main Street Program
Elgin, Elgin Main Street
Ennis, Ennis Main Street 
Farmersville, Farmersville Main Street Program
Georgetown, Georgetown Main Street
Gladewater, Gladewater Main Street
Goliad, Goliad Main Street Project
Gonzales, Gonzales Main Street
Grand Saline, Grand Saline Main Street Program
Grapevine, Grapevine Main Street
Greenville, Greenville Main Street
Harlingen, Harlingen Downtown Improvement District
Henderson, Henderson Main Street Project
Hillsboro, Hillsboro Main Street Program
Houston Emancipation Avenue
Huntsville, Huntsville Main Street Program
Kerrville, Kerrville Main Street
Kilgore, Kilgore Main Street Program
Kingsville, Kingsville Main Street Program
La Grange, Main Street LaGrange
Laredo, Streets of Laredo Urban Mall
Levelland, Main Street Levelland
Linden, Linden Main Street 
Livingston, Livingston Main Street Program
Llano, Llano Main Street Program
Longview, Longview Partnership
Lufkin, Main Street Lufkin
Luling, Luling Main Street
Marshall, Marshall Main Street Program
McKinney, McKinney Main Street
Mineola, Mineola Main Street
Mount Pleasant, Mount Pleasant Main Street
Mount Vernon, Mount Vernon Main Street
Nacogdoches, Main Street Nacogdoches
New Braunfels, New Braunfels Main Street
Palestine, Palestine Main Street Program
Paris, Paris Main Street Project
Pearsall, Pearsall Main Street Program
Pharr, City of Pharr
Pilot Point, Pilot Point Main Street
Pittsburg, Main Street Pittsburg
Plainview, City of Plainview
Rio Grande City, Rio Grande City Main Street 
Rockwall, Rockwall Main Street 
Rosenberg, Rosenberg Main Street 
Royse City, Royse City Main Street
San Angelo, San Angelo Main Street Program
San Augustine, Sane Augustine Main Street 
San Marcos, Main Street San Marcos
Sealy, Sealy Main Street 
Seguin, Seguin Main Street Program
Sherman, Sherman Main Street 
Taylor, Taylor Main Street
Temple, Temple Main Street 
Texarkana, Texarkana Main Street Program
Tyler, Heart of Tyler
Uvalde, Uvalde Main Street
Vernon, Vernon Main Street
Victoria, Victoria Main Street
Waco, City Center Waco
Waxahachie, Main Street Program, City of Waxahachie
Weatherford, Weatherford Main Street 
Winnsboro, Main Street Winnsboro

Utah
No designated programs

Vermont
Barre, Barre Main Street Program
Bellows Falls, Village of Bellows Falls
Bennington, Better Bennington Corporation
Bradford, Bradford Community Development Corporation
Brandon, Brandon Village Partnership
Brattleboro, Building a Better Brattleboro
Bristol, Bristol Downtown Community Partnership
Burlington, Church Street Marketplace
Middlebury, Middlebury Business Association
Montpelier, Montpelier Downtown Community Association
Morristown, Town of Morristown
Newport, Newport City Downtown
Poultney, Poultney Downtown Revitalization
Randolph, Randolph Area Community
Rutland, Rutland Partnership
Springfield, Springfield on the Move
St. Albans, St. Albans for the Future
St. Johnsbury, St. Johnsbury Economic Development Office
Stowe, www.gostowe.com, Stowe Area Association 
Vergennes, Vergennes Partnership, Inc.
Waterbury, Downtown Waterbury Partnership
White River Junction/Hartford, White River Junction/Hartford
Windsor, Windsor Mount Ascutney
Winooski, Downtown Winooski Inc.

Virginia
Altavista, Altavista On Track
Bedford, Bedford Main Street, Inc.
Berryville, Berryville Main Street
Blackstone, Downtown Blackstone, Inc.
Culpeper, Culpeper Renaissance, Inc.
Danville, River District Association
Franklin, Downtown Franklin Association
Harrisonburg, Harrisonburg Downtown Renaissance
Luray, Luray Downtown Initiative, Inc.
Lynchburg, Lynch's Landing
Manassas, Historic Manassas, Inc.
Marion, Marion Downtown Revitalization Association
Orange, Orange Downtown Alliance
Radford, Main Street Radford, Inc.
Rocky Mount, Community Partnership
South Boston, Destination Downtown
Staunton, Staunton Downtown Development Association
Warrenton, The Partnership for Warrenton Foundation
Waynesboro, Waynesboro Downtown Development, Inc.
Winchester, Old Town Development Board

Washington
Auburn, Auburn Downtown Association
Bainbridge Island, Bainbridge Island Downtown Association
Chelan, Historic Downtown Chelan Assoc.
Ellensburg, Ellensburg Downtown Association
Kennewick, Historic Downtown Kennewick Partnership
Langley, Langley Main Street Association
Mount Vernon, Mount Vernon Downtown Association
Olympia, Olympia Downtown Association
Port Angeles, Port Angeles Downtown Association
Port Townsend, Port Townsend Main Street Program
Puyallup, Puyallup Main Street Association
Selah, Selah Downtown Association
Walla Walla, Downtown Walla Walla Foundation
Wenatchee, Wenatchee Downtown Association
Affiliated Programs
Renton, Renton Downtown Partnership

West Virginia
Charleston - East End, Charleston East End Main Street
Charleston - Charleston West Side, Charleston West Side Main Street
Fairmont, Main Street Fairmont, Inc.
Kingwood, Main Street Kingwood
Mannington, Mannington Main Street
Martinsburg, Main Street Martinsburg, Inc
Morgantown, Main Street Morgantown, Inc.
Philippi, Main Street Philippi
Point Pleasant, Main Street Point Pleasant
Ripley, Main Street Ripley
Ronceverte, Ronceverte Main Street
St. Albans, Saint Albans Renaissance Group
White Sulphur Springs, White Sulphur Springs

Wisconsin
Today the state coordinating program is housed within the Wisconsin Economic Development Corporation with Errin Welty as the state coordinator.

Designated Communities
Ashland, Ashland Main Street, designated 2020
Beloit, Downtown Beloit, Inc., designated 1988
Chippewa Falls, Chippewa Falls Main Street, designated 1989
Darlington, Darlington Main Street, designated 1996
De Pere, Main Street De Pere, Inc., designated 1990
Eagle River, Eagle River Main Street Program, designated 1999
Fond du Lac, Downtown FDL Partnership, designated 2004
Green Bay, On Broadway, Inc., designated 1995
Kenosha, Downtown Kenosha, Inc., designated 2014
La Crosse, Downtown Main Street, Inc., designated 2013. In 1976 the National Trust for Historic Preservation was involved in advocacy for preservation of the old post office in downtown La Crosse and incorporating this into downtown revitalization plans, though these efforts were ultimately unsuccessful.
Ladysmith, Ladysmith Main Street, designated 2013
Lake Mills, Lake Mills Main Street, designated, 2006
Marshfield, Main Street Marshfield, designated 1990
Mayville, Main Street Mayville, designated 2018
Menomonie, Main Street of Menomonie, Inc., designated 2015
Milwaukee, Historic King Drive, designated 2017
Monroe, Monroe Main Street, designated 2005
Omro, Future Omro Chamber-Main Street, designated 2011
Osceola, Osceola Main Street, designated 1997
Platteville, Platteville Main Street Program, designated 1990
Port Washington, Port Main Street, Inc., designated 2008
Prairie du Chien, Prairie du Chien Main Street, designated 2005
Racine, designated 2018
Rice Lake, Rice Lake Main Street Association, designated 1991
Ripon, Ripon Main Street, designated 1988
Sheboygan Falls, Sheboygan Falls Main Street. On April 9, 1975, Mary Means, field staff for the National Trust for Historic Preservation spoke on "Preservation is Good Business" to the Sheboygan Falls Downtown Preservation committee., Main Street program designated 1988.
Shullsburg, Advance Shullsburg, designated 2016
Sturgeon Bay, Sturgeon Bay Visitor & Commercial Development, designated 1994
Tigerton, Tigerton Main Street, Inc., designated 1993
Tomahawk, Tomahawk Main Street, Inc., designated 2008
Two Rivers, Two Rivers Main Street Program, designated 1996
Viroqua, Viroqua Chamber Main Street, designated 1989
Watertown, Watertown Main Street Program, designated 2000
Wausau, Main Street Wausau, designated 2002
West Allis, Downtown West Allis BID, designated 2001

Other Communities
Algoma, Community Improvement
Columbus, CDDC/Main Street
Gillett, Revitalize Gillett, Inc.
Manitowoc, Mainly Manitowoc, Inc.
Milwaukee, Lincoln Village Business Association
Milwaukee, Mosaic on Burleigh, Burleigh Street CDC
Milwaukee, North Avenue Gateway, North Avenue Community Development Corporation
Milwaukee, Silver City, Layton Boulevard West Neighbors, Inc.
Milwaukee, Sohi, West End Development Corporation
Pewaukee, Positively Pewaukee
Portage, Main Street Portage, Inc.
Rhinelander, Downtown Rhinelander, Inc.
Richland Center, Richland Main Street Association/Chamber
Sharon, Sharon Main Street Project
Stevens Point, Stevens Point Main Street Program
West Bend, West Bend Main Street Program
Whitewater, Downtown Whitewater, Inc.

Wyoming

Evanston, Evanston Urban Renewal Agency
Green River, Green River Main Street
Laramie, Laramie Main Street
Rawlins, Rawlins Main Street
Rock Springs, Rock Springs Main Street

References

External links
 of The National Trust for Historic Preservation
 of Main Street America

Business organizations based in the United States
Heritage organizations
Urban planning in the United States